Theodor Zeilau (1 February 1884 – 5 May 1970) was a Danish modern pentathlete. He competed at the 1912 Summer Olympics.

References

External links
 

1884 births
1970 deaths
Danish male modern pentathletes
Olympic modern pentathletes of Denmark
Modern pentathletes at the 1912 Summer Olympics
People from Nyborg
Sportspeople from the Region of Southern Denmark